Saúl H. Calandra (22 October 1904 – 14 May 1973) was an Argentine football (soccer) midfielder who competed in the 1928 Olympic games. He was a member of the Argentine team, which won the silver medal in the football tournament. He was also a runner up in the 1927 Copa Lipton. Calandra played club football with Estudiantes de La Plata.

References

1904 births
1973 deaths
Footballers from La Plata
Argentine footballers
Footballers at the 1928 Summer Olympics
Olympic footballers of Argentina
Olympic silver medalists for Argentina
Argentina international footballers
Estudiantes de La Plata footballers
Olympic medalists in football
Medalists at the 1928 Summer Olympics
Association football midfielders